Hercules is a musical based on the Walt Disney Animation Studios 1997 film of the same name. The music and lyrics were written by Alan Menken and David Zippel with a book by Kristoffer Diaz and Robert Horn. The production is also loosely based on the legendary hero of the same name, the son of Zeus, in Greek mythology.

Produced by Disney Theatrical Productions, the musical had a tryout at the Delacorte Theater in Central Park in August 2019 and was met with a mixed critical response.

Development 
In July 2017, Alan Menken announced that he was working on a stage adaptation of the 1997 film Hercules. On February 6, 2019, it was announced that the theatrical adaptation would premiere later that year.

Productions

Original Manhattan production (2019) 
The world premiere occurred at the Delacorte Theater in Central Park, Manhattan, New York, as part of its Public Works program from August 31 until September 8. Menken and David Zippel returned to compose and write the songs, while Kristoffer Diaz wrote the book, Lear deBessonet directed, and Chase Brock choreographed. The cast included Jelani Alladin (Hercules), Roger Bart (Hades), Jeff Hiller (Panic), Joel Frost (Nessus), Nelson Chimilio (Pain), James Monroe Iglehart (Phil), Ramona Keller (Thalia), Tamika Lawrence (Calliope), Krysta Rodriguez (Meg), and Rema Webb (Terpsichore). Menken wrote new songs for the musical, as well as reusing the film's original works.

Future 
On March 22, 2020, Alan Menken appeared on Rosie O'Donnell's livestream benefit for the Actors Fund, where he talked about his upcoming projects, saying  "I'm working on Disenchanted, the sequel to Enchanted, and I have another Broadway show" and in a separate thought, he added "Hercules is coming to the stage. Of course we did that in Central Park last summer." Disney Theatrical subsequently confirmed that they intend to make the product available for licensing. On May 16, 2020, it was reported that Robert Horn will write a new iteration for the musical, with Lear deBessonet returning as director. On August 18, 2020, Menken confirmed that the musical is indeed being adapted to Broadway.

In April 2022, it was announced that a revised version of the musical would play at Paper Mill Playhouse in Millburn, New Jersey during the 2022-23 season, from February 16 to March 19, 2023. The revised book will be written by Kwame Kwei-Armah and Robert Horn. Announced cast members include Bradley Gibson as Hercules, Shuler Hensley as Hades, Iglehart reprising his role as Phil, and Isabelle McCalla as Meg. Rounding out the cast will be Charity Angél Dawson (Clio), Tiffany Mann (Calliope), Anastascia McClesky (Thalia), Destinee Rea (Terpischore), and Rashidra Scott (Melpomene) as the Muses, Reggie De Leon and Jeff Blumenkrantz as Pain and Panic, Kathryn Allison as Despina, Allyson Kaye Daniel as Aunt Tithesis/Lachesis, Lucia Giannetta as Atropos, Jesse Nager as Nessus, Dennis Stowe and Kristen Faith Oei as Zeus and Hera, and Anne Fraser Thomas as Clotho.

Notable casts

Musical numbers 
The music was composed by Alan Menken, with lyrics by David Zippel.

Delacorte (2019) 
 "To Be Human" (Prologue)
 "The Gospel Truth"±
 "The Gospel Truth" (Reprise 1-"He Ran the Underworld")±
 "The Prophecy"
 "The Gospel Truth" (Reprise 2-"Hades Was Not Amused")
 "The Gospel Truth" (Reprise 3-"Young Herc Was Mortal Now")±
 "Uniquely Greek Town Square"
 "Go the Distance"±
 "One Last Hope"±
 "The Gospel Truth" (Reprise 4-"Young Herc Was On His Way")
 "Forget About It"
 "A Cool Day In Hell"
 "Uniquely Greek Tough Town"
 "Zero to Hero"±
 "A Cool Day In Hell" (Reprise)
 "Shooting Star"±
 "One Last Hope" (Reprise)/"Go the Distance" (Reprise)
 "The Gospel Truth" (Reprise 5-"Herc Jumped the Garden Wall")
 "I Won't Say (I'm in Love)"±
 "Great Bolts of Thunder"
 "To Be Human"
 "A Star Is Born"±
 "Go the Distance" (Finale)±
±  Indicates a song from the original movie

Paper Mill (2023) 

 Act I
 "Prologue" - Company
 "Gospel Truth I"± - Muses & Ensemble
 "Gospel Truth II"± - Muses & Ensemble
 "The Prophecy" - Fates
 "Gospel Truth III" - Muses
 "Despina's Lullaby (Part One)" - Despina
 "Gospel Truth IV"± - Muses & Ensemble
 "Uniquely Greek Town Square" - Ensemble
 "Despina's Lullaby (Part Two)" - Despina
 "Go the Distance" - Hercules
 "Phil's Soul Spot" - Phil & Muses
 "One Last Hope"± - Phil
 "Gospel Truth V" - Muses
 "Forget About It" - Meg & Hercules
 "Cool Day in Hell" - Hades, Pain, Panic & Fates
 "Uniquely Greek Tough Town" - Ensemble
 "Zero to Hero"± - Muses, Hercules, Phil & Ensemble
 "Act One Finale" - Hercules, Muses & Ensemble

 Act II
 "Shooting Star" - Hercules
 "A Muse Bouche" - Muses
 "I'm Back!" - Phil
 "One Last Hope/Go the Distance (reprises)" - Phil & Hercules
 "Cool Reprise in Hell" - Hades, Pain & Panic
 "Gospel Truth VI" - Muses
 "I Won't Say (I'm in Love)"± - Meg & Muses
 "Great Bolts of Thunder" - Company
 "To Be Human" - Hercules
 "A Star is Born"± - Company
 "Go the Distance (finale)"± - Company

±  Indicates a song from the original movie

Reception 
The world premiere production has garnered mixed reviews from critics, with many praising the cast, music, story, and production value. Thom Geier, of TheWrap, praised the production, saying it "works better than bigger-budgeted recent efforts like Frozen". Jessica Derschowits, of Entertainment Weekly, welcomed the "lively but low-key production that feels in many ways like the polar opposite of Disney's string of megawatt Broadway hits — which is a big part of its charm". Jesse Green, of The New York Times, gave a positive review by commenting on the "shrewd casting and amateur performers joining professionals onstage, a middling 1997 animated Disney musical becomes a pageant of civic engagement". Matt Windman, of AM New York Metro, gave a mixed review by commenting on "the lighthearted tone of the film, Kristoffer Diaz's new book features countless zingers and inside jokes. Diaz also tries to deliver an underlying moral on the difference between being a hero and a celebrity. However, Diaz may have gone too far in changing around some of the original sequencing, which has made the second half of the show very messy".

References 

2019 musicals
Broadway musicals
Classical mythology in popular culture
Heracles in fiction
Hercules (franchise)
Musicals based on animated films
Musicals by Alan Menken
Musicals by David Zippel
Plays set in ancient Greece
Disney Theatrical Productions musicals